Jazzmania is a 1923 American silent drama film directed by Robert Z. Leonard and starring his then-wife Mae Murray. In keeping with Murray's previous films and a few of her succeeding films, the movie possesses some of the most provocative attire worn by an actress in film up to that time. As with Fascination, Edmund Goulding wrote the original screen story and screenplay.

Cast

Preservation
A print of Jazzmania is in the collection of George Eastman House.

References

External links

Jazzmania poster at moviepostershop.com
Still at silentfilmstillarchive.com

1923 films
1923 drama films
Silent American drama films
American silent feature films
American black-and-white films
Films directed by Robert Z. Leonard
Tiffany Pictures films
Metro Pictures films
1920s American films